Henricksonia is a genus of flowering plants in the daisy family.

Species
There is only one known species,  Henricksonia mexicana, native to the State of Durango in Mexico.

References

Monotypic Asteraceae genera
Flora of Durango
Coreopsideae